Bojhena Se Bojhena is an Indian Bengali romantic television soap opera that  premiered on 4 November 2013 and aired on the Star India-owned Star Jalsha channel. The soap opera, produced by Indian media company Shree Venkatesh Films, is a remake of the popular Hindi television series Iss Pyaar Ko Kya Naam Doon?, which aired on STAR Plus. It starred Yash Dasgupta and Madhumita Sarkar.

Plot

Pakhi, daughter of Sharat Ghosh Dastidar and his wife Sumitra, is a simple and traditional girl from Malda with deep-rooted family values. On the other hand, Aranya Singha Roy is a rich, arrogant and suave business magnate with no belief in love or God. His closest emotional bond is with his sister Ananya who is married to the anatagonist, Krishnendu Sengupta.

Pakhi and Aranya meet for the first time at the Rajmahal Hotel where she accidentally falls from the stage into his arms. Aranya misunderstands this as intentional and uploads a video of the incident on social media. This results in Pakhi's divorce, and her family faces humiliation. They move to Kolkata where Pakhi gets a job in the ASR Group of Industries. In the initial days, Pakhi causes problems in the office, which incurs ASR's anger and prompts him to insult her. Anu meets Pakhi and hires her to take care of Pamela, ASR's college friend and fiancee. Pakhi moves in, and ASR feels disturbed with her presence in his house. Circumstances bring them close and they share some romantic moments together. Meanwhile, Krishnendu (Anu's husband) lusts for Pakhi. Misunderstandings creep in between ASR and Pakhi and she is compelled to accept Krishnendu's proposal, leaving ASR heartbroken. However, Pakhi realizes the true intention of Krishnendu and breaks the alliance. ASR breaks off the engagement with Pamela, and reconcile with Pakhi.

In parallel, Akki and Piu fall for each other. His mother, Pammi, resents Piu but ASR covinces her for their marriage. The plot introduces Harry, Pammi's nephew, who begins to grow fondness for Pakhi. Though Pakhi considers him a good friend, their friendship incites jealousy in ASR. On Akki and Piu's marriage day, ASR tries to propose Pakhi but does not succeed. Krishnendu plots against the lovers and succeeds in breaking them apart.

Anu is found to be pregnant. ASR strikes a deal with Pakhi to marry him, refusing which will lead to the cancellation of Akki and Piu's wedding. Pakhi agrees and is welcomed into the Singha Roy family. Pakhi tries to figure out the reason for ASR's strange proposal. When he finally reveals the reason, she tries to clarify her side but ASR is adamant. He is kidnapped by Krishnendu on his way to London. After a lot of hurdles, ASR and Pakhi succeed to expose Krishnendu and Pamela and reunite. They get married but find Krishnendu in front of them, to their surprise. ASR is shot and falls into the river; Pakhi undergoes mental trauma. Harry and Gauri get married.

6 months leap

Krishnendu owns ASR's properties and Pakhi's condition worsens gradually. Radhe, ASR's lookalike is introduced in Udaygarh when the family visits. Radhe and his family members, Baisaa and Bijli (her daughter) come to the Singha Roy house. Pakhi is convinced that Radhe is ASR and fakes her intention of marrying Krishnendu, much to his happiness, when Radhe reveals that he is indeed ASR. Krishnendu is arrested and sent to jail. Now, Bijli comes in between ASR and Pakhi. A new character, Raj, is introduced who is trying to get revenge on the Singha Roy family because his father had left him and his mother for ASR's mother. However, misunderstanding is cleared and he leaves. Khushi, Pakhi's twin sister, is introduced and her fiancé, Arnab. The show ends on a happy note with Khushi and Arnab getting married.

Cast
 Yash Dasgupta as Aranya Singha Roy aka ASR – A businessman; Konika's son; Ananya's brother; Arko and Raj's cousin; Pamela's ex-fiancé; Pakhi's husband; Krishnendu's rival
 Madhumita Sarkar as 
Pakhi Ghosh Dastidar Singha Roy – Sharad and Sumitra's adoptive daughter; Khushi's twin sister; Piu's cousin; Pamela, Krishnendu and Bijli's rival; Aranya's wife Raj's former love interest
Khushi Pratap – Pratap's adoptive daughter; Pakhi's twin sister; Arnav's wife
 Koushik Roy / Monoj Ojha as Krishnendu Sengupta – A corrupt lawyer; Ananya's husband; Aranya and Pakhi's rival
 Debaparna Chakraborty as Ananya "Anu" Singha Roy Sengupta – Konika's daughter; Aranya's sister; Arko and Raj's cousin; Krishnendu's wife
 Monoj Ojha as Siddhant Bose aka Sid
 Monalisa Pal as Pamela Bose – Aranya's ex-fiancée, Pakhi's rival
 Kushal Chakraborty as Sharad Banik – Binapani's brother; Sumitra's husband; Piu's father; Pakhi's uncle and adoptive father 
 Reshmi Sen as Sumitra Banik – Sharad's wife; Piu's mother; Pakhi's aunt and adoptive mother
 Tania Kar as Piu Banik Singha Roy – Sharad and Sumitra's daughter; Pakhi's cousin; Arko's wife
 Abhishek Bose as Arko "Akki" Singha Roy – Ranju and Pammi's son; Ananya and Aranya's cousin; Piu's husband
 Anuradha Roy as Ranibala Singha Roy – Ranju and Konika's mother; Ananya, Aranya and Arko's grandmother
 Moumita Chakraborty as Binapani – Sharad's sister; Piu's aunt; Pakhi's adoptive aunt
 Moyna Mukherjee as Paramjit "Pammi" Singha Roy – Ranju's wife; Arko's mother; Harry's aunt
 Debduth Ghosh as Ranju Singha Roy – Ranibala's son; Konika's brother; Pammi's husband; Arko's father
 John Bhattacharya as Hariharan "Harry" Singh – Pammi's nephew; Arko's cousin; Gouri's husband
 Alivia Sarkar as Gouri Singh – Manoroma's daughter; Pakhi and Piu's cousin; Harry's wife
 Pinky Mallick as Manoroma – Gouri's mother; Pakhi and Piu's aunt
 Ujani Dasgupta as Bijli – Aranya's former love interest; Pakhi's rival
 Rita Dutta Chakraborty as Surilli Bai /Bai Saa
 Indrani Basu as Konika Singha Roy – Ranibala's daughter; Ranju's sister; Aranya and Ananya's mother
 Samrat Mukherjee as Raj Majumdar – Aranya and Ananya's cousin; Aranya and Pakhi's former rival
 Riju Biswas as Arnav Pratap – Pratap's son; Khushi's husband
 Sudip Mukherjee as Pratap – Arnav's father; Khushi's adoptive father
 Dolon Roy as Mrs. Pratap – Arnav's mother; Khushi's adoptive mother

Special appearances
 Soham Chakraborty to promote Bangali Babu English Mem
 Arjun Chakraborty & Urmila Mahanta to promote Chirodini Tumi Je Amar 2
 Koel Mallick to promote Arundhuti
 Srabanti Chatterjee & Sayantika Banerjee to promote Bindaas
 Mimi Chakraborty to promote Yoddha:The Worrior
 Prosenjit Chatterjee to promote Force
 Abir Chatterjee & Sourov Das to promote Baadshahi Angti
Srabanti Chatterjee to promote Shudhu Tomari Jonyo

Reception
The series is ranked as the most watched television serial since its premiere. It fetched a TRP of 15.1. The serial received 10 awards at the Tele Samman Awards (2015).

Adaptations

References

External links
 
 Bojhena Se Bojhena at Disney+ Hotstar
 Shree Venkatesh Films

2013 Indian television series debuts
Bengali-language television programming in India
Star Jalsha original programming
2016 Indian television series endings